Jarratt is a town in Greensville and Sussex counties in the U.S. state of Virginia. The population was 652 at the 2020 census. In 1848, Jarratt was a stop on the Petersburg Railroad.  Jaratt was incorporated in 1938.

Geography
Jarratt is located on the border of Greensville and Sussex counties, just west of Interstate 95, which provides access from Exit 20 (Henry Road).

The former Petersburg Railroad line within the town was acquired by the Atlantic Coast Line Railroad of Virginia, which is today part of the CSX North End Subdivision. It also contained a junction with the main line of the Virginian Railway, which was acquired by the Norfolk and Western Railway, and later abandoned, with the exception of a short spur west from the North End Subdivision to the Georgia-Pacific Jarratt Sheathing Plant.

Government and infrastructure

The United States Postal Service operates the Jarratt Post Office, which is directly on the Sussex-Greensville County Line.

The Virginia Department of Corrections operates the Greensville Correctional Center in unincorporated Greensville County, near Jarratt. Greensville houses the Commonwealth of Virginia execution chamber, which has been obsolete since the abolishment of capital punishment in 2021.

Demographics

2020 census

Note: the US Census treats Hispanic/Latino as an ethnic category. This table excludes Latinos from the racial categories and assigns them to a separate category. Hispanics/Latinos can be of any race.

2010 Census
As of the census of 2000, there were 589 people, 271 households, and 175 families residing in the town. The population density was 464.8 people per square mile (179.1/km2). There were 293 housing units at an average density of 231.2 per square mile (89.1/km2). The racial makeup of the town was 63.16% White, 35.99% African American, 0.17% Asian, 0.34% from other races, and 0.34% from two or more races.

There were 271 households, out of which 30.3% had children under the age of 18 living with them, 44.6% were married couples living together, 15.5% had a female householder with no husband present, and 35.1% were non-families. 32.5% of all households were made up of individuals, and 16.6% had someone living alone who was 65 years of age or older. The average household size was 2.17 and the average family size was 2.71.

In the town, the population was spread out, with 22.4% under the age of 18, 7.3% from 18 to 24, 27.0% from 25 to 44, 25.6% from 45 to 64, and 17.7% who were 65 years of age or older. The median age was 41 years. For every 100 females, there were 86.4 males. For every 100 females age 18 and over, there were 75.8 males.

The median income for a household in the town was $32,125, and the median income for a family was $38,942. Males had a median income of $31,319 versus $30,417 for females. The per capita income for the town was $24,291. About 11.4% of families and 13.0% of the population were below the poverty line, including 13.3% of those under age 18 and 8.5% of those age 65 or over.

References

External links

Town of Jarratt official website

Towns in Greensville County, Virginia
Towns in Sussex County, Virginia
Towns in Virginia